Elko County Courthouse is a historic building listed on the National Register of Historic Places and located at 571 Idaho Street in Elko, Nevada.

History 
The original courthouse building was finished in 1869. It was torn down in 1910 and replaced with the current building.

The site was "a scene of terror" on the night of July 18, 1870, when a giant burning chandelier fell into a throng of people.

References

External links

 Photo of courthouse in 1989
 Photos of courthouse at Waymarking

Buildings and structures in Elko County, Nevada
Courthouses on the National Register of Historic Places in Nevada
County courthouses in Nevada
National Register of Historic Places in Elko County, Nevada
W. H. Weeks buildings
Elko, Nevada
Neoclassical architecture in Nevada